Ahar and Heris (electoral district) is the 4th electoral district in the East Azerbaijan Province of Iran. This electoral district has a population of 196,842 and elects 1 member of parliament.

1980
MP in 1980 from the electorate of Ahar and Heris. (1st)
 Yadollah Dehghani

1984
MP in 1984 from the electorate of Ahar and Heris. (2nd)
 Ghasem Memari

1988
MP in 1988 from the electorate of Ahar and Heris. (3rd)
 Ghasem Memari

1992
MP in 1992 from the electorate of Ahar and Heris. (4th)
 Valiollah Ahmadi-Zadsaray

1996
MP in 1996 from the electorate of Ahar and Heris. (5th)
 Ahmadi-Zadsaray

2000
MP in 2000 from the electorate of Ahar and Heris. (6th)
 Ghasem Memari

2004
MP in 2004 from the electorate of Ahar and Heris. (7th)
 Valiollah Dini

2008
MP in 2008 from the electorate of Ahar and Heris. (8th)
 Gholam-Hosein Masoudi-Reyhan

2012
MP in 2012 from the electorate of Ahar and Heris. (9th)
 Abbas Fallahi Babajan

2016

Notes

 Guardian Council overturned due to interventions in elections.

References

Electoral districts of East Azerbaijan
Ahar County
Heris County
Deputies of Ahar and Heris